Local elections were held in Cape Verde on 1 and 22 July 2012.

Results
Overall, of the 22 municipalities, the Movement for Democracy (MpD) won in 14 and the African Party for the Independence of Cape Verde (PAICV) won in 8. The MpD won two more than in the last elections and the PAICV lost two. The MpD won 47% of the votes and the PAICV won 40,3% of the votes. The abstention was 34%, up from 19,4% in the last local elections.

The MpD won in Boa Vista, Brava, Maio, Paul, Praia, Santa Catarina, São Miguel, São Domingos, São Vicente, Tarrafal and Tarrafal de São Nicolau. The PAICV won in Mosteiros, Porto Novo, Ribeira Brava, Santa Cruz, São Filipe, São Lourenço dos Órgãos, São Salvador do Mundo.

Overall results

Municipal (câmara) results
The final results are:

Municipal assembly results
The final results are:

References

External links
2012 local election result

Local elections
2012
Cape Verdean local elections
Cape Verdean local elections